Richland Township is a township in Morgan County, in the U.S. state of Missouri.

Richland Township was named on account of their fertile soil.

References

Townships in Missouri
Townships in Morgan County, Missouri